Sherman Township is located in Mason County, Illinois, United States. As of the 2010 census, its population was 526 and it contained 247 housing units.

Geography

Demographics

References

External links
City-data.com
Illinois State Archives

Townships in Mason County, Illinois
Townships in Illinois